SylvaC (with a deliberate capital C at the end) is a brand of British ornamental pottery characterised primarily by figurines of animals and Toby Jugs. The SylvaC company briefly ceased production in 1982 although production of SylvaC pieces was resumed in 1998 by the current trademark holder Norman Williams.

The company was founded in 1894 by William Copestake and William Shaw. They gave their names to the fledgling company - Shaw and Copestake. Copestake left in 1895, however, and Richard Hull became Shaw's partner. Hull's son joined in 1936 and in 1938 the Thomas Lawrence Falcon Pottery was bought (which produced pottery with the distinctive 'falcon' mark on it). However, the Shaw and Copestake company maintained its original name right up until the end.

Central to the SylvaC line throughout its history were figurines of animals, and rabbits in particular. Dogs were also popular and virtually every breed ended-up being characterised in pottery. Many variations of Toby Jugs were produced, including 'character' versions which celebrated events or tied into product advertising.

Although many colours and glazes were used, most people remember the distinctive orange or green glazes most.

SylvaC pieces are not rare; however, they are becoming collectable, and the best pieces can fetch high prices. There is a common belief that pieces made after 1982 are fakes or somehow "less" SylvaC than pieces made before then. As with any collectable, there is a vested interest in keeping prices high despite the fact that SylvaC was never particularly expensive to produce and not in any sense rare and certainly never meant to be high art. The Falconware/SylvaC brands have passed through many hands since the days of Shaw&Copestake and the notion of a "Golden Era" of SylvaC is a very modern construct that has had a detrimental effect on all of the great pottery houses, especially those based in Stoke-on-Trent.

References

External links
 World Collectors' Net: SylvaC

Ceramics manufacturers of England